Last Mission may refer to
The Last Mission, 1950 Greek movie directed by Nikos Tsiforos
Last Mission (arcade game), 1986 arcade game by Data East
The Last Mission (video game), 1987 video game by Opera Soft
The Last Mission (documentary), a documentary about the last hours before the Japanese surrender in World War II
The Last Mission (novel), a novel by Harry Mazer about an underage USAAC soldier in World War II
Hunter × Hunter: The Last Mission, a 2013 animated film based on the Hunter × Hunter series